This list includes gangsters and organized crime figures by area of operation/sphere of influence. Some names may be listed in more than one city.

Australia
F

Melbourne

Alphonse Gangitano
Graham "The Munster" Kinniburgh
Tony Mokbel
Jason Moran
Lewis Moran
Mark Moran
Nikolai Radev
Squizzy Taylor
Andrew "Benji" Veniman
Carl Williams

Sydney
George Freeman
Michael Kanaan
Lenny McPherson
Abraham Saffro
Ivan bonnano/Craig McLaughlin

Canada

Blairmore
Florence Lassandro (1900–1923)
Emilio Picariello (1875 or 1879–1923)

Bradford
Giuseppe Ursino

Guelph
Tony Sylvestro

Hamilton
Agueci brothers
Carmen Barillaro (1944–1997)
Giacomo Luppino (1900–1987)
Enio Mora (1949–1996)
Angelo Musitano (1978–2017)
Pat Musitano (1968–2020)
Johnny Papalia (1924–1997)
Rocco Perri (1887–disappeared 1944)
Santo Scibetta
Bessie Starkman (1889 or 1890–1930)
Domenico Violi (born 1966)
Giuseppe Violi (born 1970)

Mississauga
Vincenzo DeMaria (born 1954)

Montreal
Richard Blass (1945–1975)
Alfonso Caruana (born 1946)
Frank Cotroni (1931–2004)
Vincenzo Cotroni (1911–1984)
Harry Davis (1898–1946)
Raynald Desjardins (born 1953)
Antonio Macrì (1902–1975)
Salvatore Montagna 1971–2011)
Sabatino Nicolucci (born 1946/47)
Monica Proietti (1940–1967)
Paolo Renda (1939–declared dead in 2018 after missing since 2010)
Nicolo Rizzuto (1924–2010)
Vito Rizzuto (1946–2013)
Frank Ryan (1942–1984)
Gerlando Sciascia (1934–1999)
Réal Simard (born 1951)
Rocco Sollecito (1948–2016)
Paolo Violi (1931–1978)

Niagara Falls
Carmen Barillaro (1944–1997)
Nick Nero (born 1977)

Toronto
Agueci brothers
Salvatore Calautti (1971 or 1972–2013)
Giuseppe Coluccio (born 1966)
Cosimo Commisso (born 1950)
Raffaele Delle Donne (born 1967 or 1968)
Antonio Macrì (1902–1975)
Salvatore Miceli (born 1946)
Roberto Pannunzi (born 1948)
Johnny Papalia (1924–1997)
Michele Racco (?–1980)
Norman Ryan (1895–1936)
Pietro Scarcella (born 1950)
Asau Tran (1952 or 1953–1991)
Paul Volpe (1927–1983)
Rocco Zito (1928–2016)

Vancouver
Bindy Johal (1971–1998)

Woodbridge
Carmelo Bruzzese (born 1949)
Salvatore Calautti (1971 or 1972–2013)
Alfonso Caruana (born 1946)
Antonio Commisso (born 1956)
Raffaele Delle Donne (born 1967 or 1968)
Angelo Figliomeni
Pietro Scarcella (born 1950)
Carmine Verduci (1959–2014)

Colombia

Cali

Gilberto Rodríguez Orejuela
Miguel Rodríguez Orejuela
Mery Valencia

Medellín

José Abello Silva (born 1954)
Griselda Blanco
Pablo Escobar
Carlos Lehder Rivas
Fabio Ochoa Restrepo
Jorge Luis Ochoa Vásquez
José Gonzalo Rodríguez Gacha

Ireland

Dublin

Martin Cahill, "The General" (1949–1994)
John Gilligan, "Factory John" (born 1952)
Gerry Hutch, "The Monk" (born 1963)
Daniel Kinahan
Christy Kinahan

Israel

Netanya
Asi Abutbul

Tel Aviv
Yaakov Alperon
Zeev Rosenstein

Italy

Naples
Renato Cinquegranella (born 1949)
Patrizio Bosti (born 1959)
Edoardo Contini (born 1955)
Maria Licciardi (born 1951)
Salvatore Lo Russo (born 1953)
Paolo Di Lauro (born 1953)
Cosimo Di Lauro (born 1973)
Marco Di Lauro (born 1980)
Vincenzo Licciardi (born 1965)
Francesco Mallardo (born 1951)
Giuseppe Dell'Aquila (born 1962)
Raffaele Amato (born 1965)
Cesare Pagano (born 1969)
Ketty Gabriele (born 1981)

Salerno
Francesco Matrone (born 1947)

Siderno
Vincenzo DeMaria (born 1954)
Giuseppe Coluccio (born 1966)
Cosimo Commisso (born 1950)
Antonio Macrì (1902–1975)
Roberto Pannunzi (born 1948)
Michele Racco (?–1980)
Carmelo Bruzzese (born 1949)
Antonio Commisso (born 1956)
Carmine Verduci (1959–2014)

Oppido Mamertina
Saverio Mammoliti (born 1942)

Gioia Tauro
Girolamo Piromalli (1918–1979)

Sicily (region)

Japan

Tokyo

Hisayuki Machii (1923–2002)

Yokohama

Kakuji Inagawa (1914–2007)
Susumu Ishii (1924–1991)

Mexico

Ciudad Juárez

Amado Carrillo Fuentes (1956–1997)
Vicente Carrillo Fuentes (born 1963)
Rafael Aguilar Guajardo (died 1993)
Pablo Acosta Villarreal (died 1987)

Guadalajara
Javier Barba-Hernandez (died 1986)
Rafael Caro Quintero (born 1952)
Juan José Esparragoza Moreno (born 1949)
Ernesto Fonseca Carrillo (born 1942)
Juan Matta-Ballesteros (born 1945)

Matamoros
Juan Nepomuceno Guerra (1915–2001)
Juan García Ábrego (born 1944)
Osiel Cárdenas Guillén (born 1967)
Antonio Cárdenas Guillén (1962–2010)
Jorge Eduardo Costilla Sánchez (born 1971)
Arturo Guzmán Decena (1976–2002)
Mario Cárdenas Guillén 
Rafael Cárdenas Vela

Nuevo Laredo
Miguel Treviño Morales (born 1970)
Alejandro Treviño Morales (born 1974)
Iván Velázquez-Caballero (born 1970)
José Treviño Morales

Reynosa
Samuel Flores Borrego (1972–2011)
Jaime González Durán (born 1971)
Mario Ramírez Treviño (born 1962)

Tijuana
Ramón Arellano Félix (1962–2002)
Benjamín Arellano Félix (born 1952)
Francisco Rafael Arellano Félix (1949–2013)
Carlos Arellano Félix (born 1955)
Francisco Javier Arellano Félix (born 1969)
Enedina Arellano Félix (born 1961)
Edgardo Leyva Escandón (born 1969)
Luis Fernando Sánchez Arellano (born 1977)

Netherlands

Amsterdam
Hüseyin Baybaşin (born 1956)

Poland

Pruszków

Andrzej Kolikowski, "Pershing" (1954–1999)

Puerto Rico

San Juan

Martinez Familia Sangeros
Tony Tursi (1901–1989)

Caguas
Edsel Torres Gomez

Russia

Moscow
Sergey Mikhaylov 
Semion Mogilevich (born 1946)

Saint Petersburg
Vladimir Kumarin (born 1958)

Sweden

Gothenburg
Denho Acar (born 1974)

Turkey

Ankara
Dündar Kılıç (1935–1999)

Istanbul
Nurullah Tevfik Ağansoy (1960–1996)
Alaattin Çakıcı (born 1953)
Abdullah Çatlı (1956–1996)
Sedat Peker (born 1971)
Mahmut Yıldırım (born 1951)
Kürşat Yılmaz

United Kingdom

Liverpool

 Tommy "Tacker" Comerford (1933–2003)
 Paul Grimes (born 1950)
 John Haase (born 1948)
 Sean Mercer
 Michael Showers (born 1945)
 Curtis "Cocky" Warren (born 1963)
 Anthony Whitney
 Gary Whitney
 Paul Whitney
 John Kinsella (criminal)

London

Christopher Brayford (Born 1965)
Jack Comer (1912–1996)
George Cornell (1928–1966)
Tony Lambrianou
Kenneth Noye
Bobby Cummines
Albert Dimes (1914–1972)
Frankie Fraser, "Mad Frankie" (1923–2014)
William Hill (1911–1984) 
David Hunt (gangster) 
Kray twins (Reggie Kray 1933–2000; Ronnie Kray 1933–1995)
Jack McVitie, "Jack the Hat" (1932–1967)
The Richardson Gang, Charlie and Eddie Richardson
Terry Adams (born 1954) 
Patrick Adams (born 1956)
Tommy Adams (born 1958)
Dave Courtney (born 1959)
Alf White (gangster) (1887–1942)
Ronnie Knight
Freddie Foreman
Ronnie Biggs (1929–2013)
Charlie Wilson (criminal) (1932–1990)
David McMillan (smuggler)
Roy Shaw
Lenny McLean
Bruce Reynolds
Charlie Wilson (criminal)
Buster Edwards
 Mark Lambie
Mickey Green
Gilbert Wynter

Birmingham
Michael Michael
John Palmer (criminal)

Manchester

Desmond Noonan (1959–2005)
Dominic Noonan (born 1964)
Anthony "White Tony" Johnson (1969–1991)
Lee Amos
Colin Joyce
Dale Cregan

Salford
Paul Massey (gangster) (1960–2015)
Mark Fellows (hitman)

Middlesbrough
Brian Charrington (born 1956)

Newcastle upon Tyne

Essex
Tony Tucker (1957–1995)
Patrick Tate (1958–1995)
Craig Rolfe (1969–1995)
Carlton Leach
Harry Roberts

Glasgow
 Paul Ferris (Scottish writer)
 Arthur Thompson
 Tam McGraw
 Ian McAteer

Widnes
 Shaun Attwood

United States

Boston

Gennaro Angiulo (1919–2009)
Joe Barboza (1932–1976)
James J. Bulger, "Whitey" (1929–2018)
Arthur Doe, Jr. (1960–2018)
Stephen Flemmi (born 1934)
Vincent Flemmi (1935–1979)
Jimmy Flynn (born 1934)
Donald Killeen (1923–1972)
Johnny Martorano (born 1940)
Bernard McLaughlin (1921–1961)
Edward McLaughlin (died 1965)
Paul McGonagle (1939–1974)
James McLean (1929–1965)
Patrick Nee (born 1943)
James O'Toole (1929–1973)
Alex Rocco (1936–2015)
Frank Salemme (1933-2022)
Charles Solomon (1884–1933)
Vincent Teresa (1930–1990)
Kevin Weeks (born 1956)
Howie Winter (1929–2020)

Buffalo

Albert Agueci
Vito Agueci
Peter Magaddino (1917–1976)
Stefano Magaddino (1891–1974)
Joseph E. Todaro, "Lead Pipe Joe" (1923–2012)
Frank Valenti (1911–2008)

Chicago

Tony Accardo, Antonino "Joe Batters", "Big Tuna" (1906–1992)
Joseph Aiuppa, "Joey Doves" (1907–1997)
Felix Alderisio, "Milwaukee Phil" (1912–1971)
Harry Aleman (1939–2010)
Gus Alex, "Gussie", "Mr. Ryan" (1916–1998)
Louis Alterie, Leland A. "Two Gun" Varain (1886–1935)
Samuzzo Amatuna, "Smoots" (1899–1925)
Joseph Andriacchi (born 1932)
Donald Angelini, "The Wizard of Odds" (1926–2000)
Dominick Basso (1938–2001)
Sam Battaglia, "Teets" (1908–1973)
James Belcastro (1895–1945)
Fifi Buccieri (1907–1973)
Frank Buccieri, "The Horse" (1919–2004)
Marshall Caifano (1911–2003)
Frank Calabrese, Sr. (1937–2012)
 Frank LaPorte, "Frankie"
Nicholas Calabrese (born 1942)
Al Capone, Alphonse "Big Al", "Scarface" (1899–1947)
Frank Capone, Salvatore (1895–1924)
Ralph Capone, Raffaele James "Bottles" (1894–1974)
Sam Cardinelli, [Cardinella] (1869–1921)
Samuel Carlisi (1914–1997)
Anthony Centracchio (1929–2001)
Jackie Cerone, "Jackie the Lackey" (1914–1996)
Eco James Coli (1922–1982)
James Colosimo, "Big Jim" (1878–1920)
Dominic Cortina (1925–1999)
William Daddano, Sr., "Willie Potatoes" (1912–1975)
Marco D'Amico (1936-2020)
William Dauber (1935–1980)
Mario Anthony DeStefano (1915–1975)
Sam DeStefano, "Mad Sam" (1909–1973)
John DiFronzo, "No Nose" (1928-2018)
John Dillinger (1903–1934)
Vincent Drucci, "Schemer" (1898–1927)
Terry Druggan, "Machine Gun" (1903–1954)
Ken Eto, "Joe the Jap", "Tokyo Joe", "Montana Joe" (1919–2004)
Joseph Ferriola (1927–1989)
Rocco Fischetti (1903–1964)
Louis Fratto, "Lew Farrell", "Cockeyed Louie" (1907–1967)
Sam Giancana, "Momo", "Mooney" (1908–1975)
Joseph Glimco, Joey, "Tough Guy", Joseph Glinico, Joseph Glielmi, "Little Tim Murphy" (1909–1991)
Jake Guzik, "Greasy Thumb" (1886–1956)
Murray Humphreys (1899–1965)
Joseph Lombardo, Sr., "Joey The Clown" (1929-2019)
James Marcello, "Jimmy the Man" (born 1943)
Louis Marino (1932-2017)
Jack McGurn, "Machine Gun," Vincenzo Antonio Gibaldi (1902–1936)
Bugs Moran (1893–1957)
Charles Nicoletti, "Chuckie", "The Typewriter" (1916–1977)
Frank Nitti, "The Enforcer" (1886–1943)
Dean O'Banion (1892–1924)
Ross Prio (1901–1972)
Paul Ricca, "The Waiter" (1897–1972)
John Roselli (1905–1976)
Frank Rosenthal, "Lefty" (1929–2008)
Michael Sarno (born 1958)
Gerald Scarpelli (1938–1989)
Frank Schweihs [Schwehis], "The German" (1932–2008)
Anthony Spilotro, "Tony the Ant," "Tough Tony" (1936–1986)
Michael Spilotro (1944–1986)
Victor Spilotro (1933–1996)
Al Tornabene, "Pizza Al" (1923–2009)
John Torrio, "The Brain"; "The Fox"; "Pappa Johnny" (1882–1957)
Frankie Yale (1893–1928)
Frank Zito (1893–1974)

Cleveland

Danny Greene (1933–1977)
James "Jack White" Licavoli (1904–1985)
John Nardi (1916–1977)
Alfred "Big Al" Polizzi (1900–1994)
John "John Scalise" Scalish (1912–1976)
Frank Milano (1891–1970)
Joseph "Big Joe" Lonardo (1884–1927)
Salvatore "Black Sam" Todaro (1885–1929)
John "Peanuts" Tronolone (1910–1991)
Anthony "Tony" Milano (1888–1978)
Angelo "Big Ange" Lonardo (1911–2006)

Dallas

Joseph Civello (1902–1970)

Detroit

see Purple Gang
Salvatore Catalanotte (1894–1930)
Anthony Giacalone, "Tony Jack" (1919–2001)
Kwame Kilpatrick (born 1970)
Vincent Meli (1921–2008)
Joseph Zerilli (1897–1977)

Galveston
Rosario Maceo (1887–1954)
Sam Maceo (1894–1951)
George Musey (1900–1935)
Johnny Jack Nounes (1890–1970)
Ollie Quinn
Dutch Voight

Kansas City

Charles Binaggio (1909–1950)
William "Willie the Rat" Cammisano, Sr. (1914–1995)
Anthony "Tiger" Cardarella (1926–1984)
Charles V. "Charley The Wop" Carrollo (1902–1979)
Anthony Civella (1930–2006)
Carl "Cork" Civella (1910–1994)
Giuseppe Nicoli "Nick" Civella (1912–1983)
Frank DeMayo (1885–1949)
Charles "Mad Dog" Gargotta (1900–1950)
Anthony "Tony" Gizzo (1902–1953)
Nicolo Impostato (1906–1979)
John Lazia (1896–1934)
Gaetano Lococo (1895–1993)
Tom Pendergast (1873–1945)
Peter Simone (born 1945)

Las Vegas

Charles Baron, "Babe" (1920s-1960s)
David Berman, "Davie the Jew" (1903–1957)
Herbert Blitzstein, "Fat Herbie" (1934–1997), representing the Chicago Outfit
Marshall Caifano, representing the Chicago Outfit (1911–2003)
Frank Cullotta, "The Las Vegas Boss" (1938-2020), representing the Chicago Outfit
Gus Greenbaum (1894–1958), representing the Chicago Outfit
John Roselli (1905–1976), representing the Chicago Outfit
Frank Rosenthal, "Lefty" (1929–2008)
Irving Shapiro, "Slick" (1904-1931)
Benjamin Siegel, "Bugsy" (1906–1947)
Anthony Spilotro, "Tony the Ant"; "Little Guy" (1938–1986), representing the Chicago Outfit
Michael Spilotro, "Micky" (1944–1986), representing the Chicago Outfit
Joseph Stacher, "Doc" (1902–1977)

Los Angeles

Girolamo Adamo, "Momo" (1884–1956)
Joseph Ardizzone, "Iron Man" (1884–1931)
Frank Bompensiero, "Bomp" (1905–1977)
Dominic Brooklier (1914–1984)
Frank Buccieri (1919–2004)
Jimmy Caci, "Jimmy" (1925–2011)
Mickey Cohen (1913–1976)
Frank DeSimone (1909–1967)
Rosario DeSimone, "The Chief" (1873–1946)
Vito Di Giorgio (1880–1922)
Joseph Dippolito, "Joe Dip" (1914–1974)
Jack Dragna (1891–1956)
Louis Tom Dragna (1920–2012)
Tom Dragna (1899–1977)
Rene Enriquez (born 1962)
Jimmy Fratianno, "Jimmy the Weasel" (1913–1993)
Nicholas Licata (1897–1974)
Carmen Milano, "Flipper" (1929–2006)
Peter Milano (1925–2012)
Joe Morgan, "Pegleg" (1929–1993)
Michael Rizzitello, "Mike Rizzi" (1929–2005)
Simone Scozzari, "Sam"
Joseph Sica (1911–1992)
Johnny Stompanato (1925–1958)

Milwaukee

Felix Alderisio, "Milwaukee Phil"
Frank Balistrieri

Minneapolis–Saint Paul

Isadore Blumenfeld, “Kid Cann” (1900–1981)
Danny Hogan, “Dapper” (c. 1880 – 1928)
A. A. Ames, “Doc” (1842–1911)
David Berman (1903–1957)
Amanda Danielson (1984-Present)

New Jersey

Joseph Abate
Philip Abramo, "The King Of Wall Street" (born 1945)
Anthony Accetturo, "Tumac" (born 1938)
Jose Miguel Battle, Sr. (1930–2007) "El Padrino" Former Godfather of "The Corporation" (a.k.a. The Cuban Mafia)
Ruggiero Boiardo, "Richie the Boot" (1890–1984)
Salvatore Briguglio, "Sally Bugs" (1930-1978)
Anthony Capo, "Tony" (1959/1960–2012)
Antonio Caponigro, "Tony Bananas" (Philadelphia family member based in North Jersey) (1912–1980)
Gerardo Catena, "Jerry" (1902–2000)
Angelo DeCarlo, "Gyp" (1902–1973)
Sam DeCavalcante, "The Plumber" (1912–1997)
Lawrence Dentico, "Larry Fab" (born 1923)
John DiGilio (1932–1988)
Vincent Palermo, "Vinny Ocean" (born 1944)
Angelo Prisco, "The Horn" (born 1939)
Marco Reginelli (Philadelphia family member based in South Jersey) (1897–1956)
Giovanni Riggi, "John the Eagle" (1925–2015)
Nicodemo Scarfo, "Little Nicky" (Philadelphia family member based in Atlantic City) (1929–2017)
Giuseppe Schifilliti, "Pino" (born 1938)
Gaetano Vastola, "Corky" (born 1928)
Abner Zwillman, "Longie", "Al Capone of New Jersey" (1904–1959)

New Orleans

Sam Carolla (1896–1972)
Carlos Marcello (1910–1993)

New York City

Settimo Accardi, "Big Sam" (1902–1997)
Joe Adonis (1902–1971)
Evsei Agron (died 1985)
John Alite (born 1962)
Vincent Alo, "Jimmy Blue Eyes" (1904–2001)
Louis Amberg (1897–1935)
Victor Amuso, "Little Vic" (born 1934)
Albert Anastasia (1902–1957)
Anthony Anastasio, "Tough Tony" (1906–1963)
Marat Balagula (1943-2019)
Leroy Barnes (1933-2012)
Thomas Bilotti (1940–1985)
Joseph Bonanno, "Joe Bananas" (1905–2002)
Salvatore Bonanno (1932–2008)
Lepke Buchalter (1897–1944)
Louis Buchalter (1897–1944)
James Burke, "Jimmy the Gent" (1931–1996)
Anthony Casso, "Gaspipe" (1942–2020)
Louis Campagna, "Little New York" (1900–1955)
Anthony Carfano, "Little Augie Pisano" (1895–1959)
Paul Castellano, "Big Paul", called "PC" by his family. (1915–1985)
Gerardo Catena, "Jerry" (1902–2000)
Dominick Cirillo, "Quiet Dom" (born 1929)
Vincent Coll, "Mad Dog" (1908–1932)
Joseph Colombo (1923–1978)
Jimmy Coonan (born 1946)
Mike Coppola, "Trigger Mike" (1904–1966)
Anthony Corallo, "Tony Ducks" (1913–2000)
Nicholas Corozzo (born 1940)
Frank Costello (1891–1973)
Steven Crea, "Wonderboy" (born 1947)
Edward Cummiskey, "Eddie the Butcher" (1934-1976)
Domenico Cutaia, "Danny" (1936–2018)
Alphonse D'Arco, "The Professor" (1932–2019)
Aniello Dellacroce, "Mr. Neil" (1914–1985)
Roy DeMeo (1942–1983)
Thomas DeSimone, "Two-Gun Tommy" (1950–1979)
Tom Devaney (died 1976)
Jack Diamond, "Legs" (1897–1931)
Johnny Dio (1914–1979)
Thomas Eboli, "Tommy Ryan" (1911–1972)
Carmine Fatico, "Charley Wagons" (1910–1991)
Mickey Featherstone (born 1948)
John Franzese, "Sonny" (1917–2020)
Michael Franzese, "Yuppie Don" (born 1951)
Christopher Furnari, "Christie Tick" (1924-2018)
Thomas Gagliano (1884–1951)
Carmine Galante (1910–1979)
Joey Gallo, "Crazy Joe" (1929–1972)
Carlo Gambino (1902–1976)
Vito Genovese (1897–1969)
Mario Gigante (born 1923)
Vincent Gigante, "Chin" (1928–2005)
Gene Gotti (born 1946)
John Gotti (1940–2002)
John A. Gotti, "Junior" (born 1964)
Peter Gotti (1939–2021)
Richard G. Gotti (born 1967)
Richard V. Gotti (born 1942)
Sammy Gravano, "The Bull" (born 1945)
Henry Hill (1943–2012)
Vyacheslav Ivankov (1940–2009)
Ronald Jerothe, "Foxy" (1947–1974)
Gennaro Langella, "Jerry Lang" (1938–2013)
Meyer Lansky (1902–1983)
Philip Lombardo, "Benny Squint" (1908–1987)
Anthony Loria, Sr., "Tony Aboudamita" (died 1989)
Salvatore Lucania, "Charlie 'Lucky' Luciano" (1897–1962)
Frank Lucas (1930-2019)
Thomas Lucchese, "Three Finger Brown" (1899–1967)
Owney Madden (1891–1965)
Joseph Magliocco (1898–1963)
Vincent Mangano (1888–1951)
Francesco Manzo, "Frankie the Wop" (1925–2012)
Richard Martino (born 1961)
Joe Masseria, "Joe the Boss" (1886–1931)
Joe Massino, "Big Joey" (born 1943)
Giuseppe Morello (1867–1930)
Nicholas Morello (1890–1916)
Willie Moretti, "Willie" (1894–1951)
Hughie Mulligan (died 1973)
Victor Orena, "Little Vic" (born 1934)
Vincent Papa (1917–1977)
Carmine Persico (born 1933)
Joseph Pinzolo (1887–1930)
Joe Profaci (1897–1962)
Bosko Radonjich (1943–2011)
Philip Rastelli (1918–1991)
Abraham Reles (1906–1941)
Arnold Rothstein, "The Big Bankroll" (1882–1928)
Alex Rudaj (born 1968)
Anthony Salerno, "Fat Tony" (1911–1992)
Frank Scalice, "Don Cheech" (1893–1957)
Gregory Scarpa, "The Grim Reaper" and "The Mad Hatter" (1928–1994)
Nicolo Schiro, "Cola" (1872–1957)
Dutch Schultz (1901–1935)
Bugsy Siegel (1906–1947)
Mickey Spillane (1934–1977)
Harry Strauss, "Pittsburgh Phil" (1909–1941)
Anthony Strollo, "Tony Bender" (1899–1962)
Vojislav Stanimirović, "Mr Stan" Born (1937)
Ciro Terranova, "The Artichoke King" (1888–1938)
Frank Tieri (1904–1981
Joe Valachi (1903–1971)
Paul Vario (1914–1988)
Frankie Yale (1893–1928)

Philadelphia

Angelo Bruno (1910–1980)
Andrew Thomas DelGiorno (born 1940)
Jack Diamond (1897–1931)
Mickey Duffy (1888–1931)
Waxey Gordon (1888–1952)
Joseph Ida 
Phil Leonetti, "Crazy Phil" (born 1953)
Joseph Ligambi, "Uncle Joe" (born 1939)
Joseph Massimino 
Joseph Merlino, "Skinny Joey" (born 1962)
Marco Reginelli, "Small Man" (1897–1956)
Harry Riccobene (1909–2000)
Harry Rosen, "Nig" 
Salvatore Sabella (1891–1962)
Nicky Scarfo Jr., "Nicky" (born 1964)
Nicodemo Scarfo, "Little Nicky" (1929–2017)
Pat Spirito (1939–1983)
John Stanfa (born 1940)
Philip Testa, "Chicken Man" (1924–1981)
Salvatore Testa (1956–1984)

Pittsburgh

John Larocca (1956–1984)
Michael James Genovese (1984–2006)
John Bazzano Jr (2006–2008)
Thomas "Sonny" Ciancutti (2008–2021)

Providence

Nicholas Bianco (1932–1994)
Matthew L. Guglielmetti, Jr. (born 1949)
Luigi Manocchio (born 1927)
Raymond L.S. Patriarca (1908–1984)

St. Louis

Dinty Colbeck (1890–1943)

San Diego

Frank Bompensiero, "Bomp" (1905–1977)

San Francisco

James Lanza, "Jimmy the Hat" (1902–2006)

San Jose

Onofrio Sciortino (died 1959)

Tampa

Ignacio Antinori (1885–1940)
Santo Trafficante, Sr. (1886–1954)
Santo Trafficante, Jr. (1914–1987)

Wilkes-Barre/Scranton

Rosario "Russell" Bufalino (1903–1994)
John Sciandra (1899–1940)
Frank "The Irishman" Sheeran (1920–2003)

Vietnam

Hanoi

Dương Văn Khánh ( Khánh Trắng ) (1956-1998)
Nguyễn Thị Hạnh ( Hạnh Sự ) (born 1956)
Trần Quốc Sơn ( Sơn Bạch Tạng ) (born 1962)

Haiphong
Ngô Đức Minh ( Minh Sứt ) (1956-2018)
Vũ Hoàng Dung ( Dung Hà ) (1965-2000)
Ngô Chí Thành ( Thành Chân )
Phạm Đình Nên ( Cu Nên ) (1957-1997)

Saigon
Lê Văn Viễn ( Bảy Viễn ) (1904-1972)
Lê Văn Đại ( Đại Cathay ) (1940-1967)
Huỳnh Tỳ (1944-?)
Vũ Đình Khánh ( Sơn Đảo ) (1944-1975)
Trương Văn Cam ( Năm Cam ) (1947-2004)
Châu Phát Lai Em ( Lai Em ) (1959-2004)

See also

List of American mobsters of Irish descent
List of British gangsters
List of godfathers
List of Italian-American mobsters
List of Italian Mafia crime families
List of Jewish-American mobsters
List of post-Soviet mobsters
List of Sicilian mafiosi
Mafia

City
Organized crime-related lists